Ben Hazel (born 22 May 1990) is a professional English darts player, who is currently playing in World Darts Federation events.

Career
In May 2018, Hazel won the Vilnius Open, he beat Łukasz Wacławski in the final. In 2019, he reached Quarter-Finals in both the Swedish and Belfry Open.

In October 2019, he qualified for the 2020 BDO World Darts Championship as one of the Playoff Qualifiers, he defeated Jesús Noguera and Allan Edwards to secure his place in the tournament. He beat Joe Chaney in the preliminary round and Gary Robson in the last 32, before losing to Chris Landman.

World Championship results

BDO/WDF
 2020: Third round (lost to Chris Landman 3–4) (sets)
 2022: Second round (lost to Luke Littler 2–3)

References

External links
 

Living people
English darts players
1990 births
Sportspeople from Hereford
20th-century English people
21st-century English people